Ernst Otto Eduard Legal (2 May 1881 – 29 June 1955) was a German actor and opera director of Berlin State Opera.

Born on 2 May 1881 in Schlieben in the Prussian Province of Saxony, he was the father of the actress Marga Legal. He died in Berlin at age 74.

Selected filmography
 The Mayor of Zalamea (1920) - Sergeant
 The Story of Christine von Herre (1921) - Schloßgärtner Dr.Ramiro
 The Agony of the Eagles (1922) - Fouché
 It Illuminates, My Dear (1922) - Tapier
 Friedrich Schiller (1923) - Iffland
 Die Nibelungen (1924)
 Waxworks (1924) - Poison-Maker of the Czar
 There Is a Woman Who Never Forgets You (1930)
 The Girlfriend of a Big Man (1934) - Vorhangzieher des Stadttheaters
 Hanneles Himmelfahrt (1934) - Seidel
 Charley's Aunt (1934) - Nelson
 Jede Frau hat ein Geheimnis (1934) - Dagmas Vater
 Love Conquers All (1934)
 Hundred Days (1935) - Ludwig XVIII
 Der Mann mit der Pranke (1935) - Kraatz, Chauffeur
 One Too Many on Board (1935) - Kriminalwachtmeister
 Anschlag auf Schweda (1935) - Hotelier Sutter
 Augustus the Strong (1936) - Graf Saumagen
 The Dreamer (1936) - Schladebach, Bäckermeister
 Kater Lampe (1936) - Spielwarenfabrikant Neubert
 Street Music (1936) - Otto Brommel - Straßenmusikant
 Maria the Maid (1936) - Mayor Kilmank
  (1936) - Ballon
 Kinderarzt Dr. Engel (1936) - Josef Boelke
 His Best Friend (1937) - Emil Müller, Hausverwalter
 The Divine Jetta (1937) - Professor Cravallo
 The Glass Ball (1937) - Trödler
 The Man Who Was Sherlock Holmes (1937) - Dieter Jean
 When Women Keep Silent (1937) - Ricardo - Direktor einer Schallplattenfirma
 Seven Slaps (1937) - Mr. Strawman
 To New Shores (1937) - Stout
 Gabriele: eins, zwei, drei (1937) - Polizeibeamter
 The Model Husband (1937) - Möbelpacker
 Diamonds (1937) - Chattler
 Ein Volksfeind (1937) - Baumeister
 The Mountain Calls (1938) - Amtsrichter
 Das große Abenteuer (1938) - Kapitän der 'Paddy'
 The Roundabouts of Handsome Karl (1938) - Der alte Albert - Kellner
 Das Mädchen mit dem guten Ruf (1938) - Cosmo
 Musketier Meier III (1938) - Der Maire von Mavrin
 The Secret Lie (1938) - Bankdirektor, Finanzberater Carmens
 Nights in Andalusia (1938) - Wirt in Sevilla
 Diskretion - Ehrensache (1938) - Sergeant
 Dance on the Volcano (1938) - Der Wirt
 Unsere kleine Frau (1938) - Polizeisergeant
 Dance on the Volcano (1938) - Dr. Thibaud (uncredited)
 Das Leben kann so schön sein (1938) - Der Möbelhändler
 Mia moglie si diverte (1938) - Il cameriere di Paolo
 The Immortal Heart (1939) - Bader Bratvogel
 Spiel im Sommerwind (1939) - August Krückemeier
 The Leghorn Hat (1939) - Dienstmann
 Kennwort Machin (1939) - Dinklage, Werkstattvermieter
 The Journey to Tilsit (1939) - Herr Wittkuhn
 My Aunt, Your Aunt (1939) - Amtmann Henkel
 Der dunkle Punkt (1940)
 Pedro Will Hang (1941) - Plebejano
 Ich klage an (1941)
 The Comedians (1941) - Leibarzt der Zarin
 Jakko (1941) - Polizeikommissar
 Heimaterde (1941)
 Die heimlichen Bräute (1942) - Kutzbach
 A Gust of Wind (1942)
 Rembrandt (1942) - Bettler
 The Golden City (1942) - Pelikan - ein Bauer
 Andreas Schlüter (1942) - Professor Sturm
 Der große Schatten (1942) - Ehemaliger Inspizient des Provinztheaters
 I pagliacci (1943) - Un criminale (uncredited)
 Fahrt ins Abenteuer (1943) - Der Direktor, dem Rudi einen Hund verkaufen will
 Symphonie eines Lebens (1943) - Musikkritiker
 Die Jungfern vom Bischofsberg (1943)
 Lache Bajazzo (1943) - Alter Verbrecher
 Romance in a Minor Key (1943) - Hard-of-hearing man
 Gefährlicher Frühling (1943)
 Immensee (1943) - Jürgens, Direktor der Spritfabrik (uncredited)
 Das schwarze Schaf (1944)
 Sieben Briefe (1944) - Kriminalrat
 Glück unterwegs (1944)
 Der Verteidiger hat das Wort (1944) - Seibold - Buchmacher
 The Degenhardts (1944)
 Dir zuliebe (1944)
 Spiel mit der Liebe (1944)
 Das Leben geht weiter (1945)
 Das Mädchen Juanita (1945) - Verwandter des Konsuls Henseling
 Rätsel der Nacht (1945)
 Leb' wohl, Christina (1945) - Opernintendant
 No Place for Love (1947) - William Spier
 Altes Herz geht auf die Reise (1947) - Amtsgerichtsrat Schulze
 Thank You, I'm Fine (1948) - August Petri, genannt Muschel
 The Adventures of Fridolin (1948) - Der Polizeipräfekt
 Und wieder 48 (1948) - Professer Kortlein
 Insolent and in Love (1948) - Nordboden, Besitzer des Detektivbüros
 The Marriage of Figaro (1949) - Antonio
 Mathilde Möhring (1950)
 A Day Will Come (1950) - Bürgermeister
 Der Untertan (1951) - Pastor Zillich
 Karriere in Paris (1952) - Vater Goriot
 The Stronger Woman (1953) - Spaziergänger
 Jonny Saves Nebrador (1953)
 Der verzauberte Königssohn (1953)
 Roman eines Frauenarztes (1954) - Professor Muthesius
 Der Himmel ist nie ausverkauft (1955) - (final film role)

External links

1881 births
1955 deaths
People from Elbe-Elster
People from the Province of Saxony
Cultural Association of the GDR members
Members of the Provisional Volkskammer
German male stage actors
German male film actors
German male silent film actors
20th-century German male actors
German opera directors
General directors of the Berlin State Opera
Recipients of the National Prize of East Germany